Thomas Askren House is a historic home located at Indianapolis, Marion County, Indiana.  It was built between about 1828 and 1833, and is a two-story, Federal style brick I-house. It has a side gable roof and a rear ell.  Also on the property is a contributing outbuilding.

It was added to the National Register of Historic Places in 2006.

References

Houses on the National Register of Historic Places in Indiana
Federal architecture in Indiana
Houses completed in 1833
Houses in Indianapolis
National Register of Historic Places in Indianapolis